Nowe Dwory may refer to:

 Nowe Dwory, Lesser Poland Voivodeship
 Nowe Dwory, Greater Poland Voivodeship